The 1947 Yugoslav Women's Basketball League is the 3rd season of the Yugoslav Women's Basketball League, the highest professional basketball league in Yugoslavia for women's. Championships is played in 1947 in Zagreb and played five teams. Champion for this season is Crvena zvezda.

Table

External links
 History of league

Yugoslav Women's Basketball League seasons
Women
1947 in women's basketball
basketball